The Federal College of Education, Okene is a federal government higher education institution located in Okene, kogi State, Nigeria. It is affiliated to University of Ibadan for its degree programmes. The current Provost is Umar Hassan.

History 
The Federal College of Education, Okene was established in 1974. It was originally known as Federal Advanced Teachers College, Okene but was later named Federal College of Education, Okene in 1985.

Courses 
The institution offers the following courses;

 Economics
 Christian Religious Studies
 Biology
 English
 Agricultural Science
 Chemistry
 Early Childhood Care Education
 French
 Geography
 Guidance and Counseling
 Hausa
 History/Social Studies
 Adult and Non-Formal Education
 Home Economics
 Igbo
 Arabic
 Business Education
 Integrated Science
 Islamic Studies
 Mathematics
 Music
 Primary Education Studies
 Social Studies
 Music
 Physical And Health Education
 Computer Education
 Fine and Applied Arts

Affiliation 
The institution is affiliated with the University of Ibadan to offer programmes leading to Bachelor of Education, (B.Ed.) in;

 Education/Biology
 Education/Chemistry
 Human Kinetics (Physical) & Health Education
 Guidance & Counseling
 Education/French
 Education/Mathematics
 Education/Christian Religious Studies
 Education/Islamic Studies
 Education/Social Studies
 Educational Management
 Education/English Language

References

1974 establishments in Nigeria
Federal colleges of education in Nigeria
Educational institutions established in 1974
Kogi State